Kinesin-associated protein 3 (KAP3) is a protein that in humans is encoded by the KIFAP3 gene. It is a non-motor, accessory subunit which co-oligomerizes with the motor subunits KIF3A and KIF3B or KIF3C, to form heterotrimeric kinesin-2 motor proteins. Kinesin-2 KAP subunits were initially characterized in echinoderms and mice.

Function 

The small G protein GDP dissociation stimulator (smg GDS) is a regulator protein having two activities on a group of small G proteins including the Rho and Rap1 family members and Ki-Ras; one is to stimulate their GDP/GTP exchange reactions, and the other is to inhibit their interactions with membranes. The protein encoded by this gene contains 9  Armadillo repeats and interacts with the smg GDS protein through these repeats. This protein, which is highly concentrated around the endoplasmic reticulum, is phosphorylated by v-src, and this phosphorylation reduces the affinity of the protein for smg GDS. It is thought that this protein serves as a linker between human chromosome-associated polypeptide (HCAP) and KIF3A/B, a kinesin superfamily protein in the nucleus, and that it plays a role in the interaction of chromosomes with an ATPase motor protein. It has also been proposed to act as a clamp, stabilizing the C-terminal half  of the otherwise unstable stalk coiled-coil.

Interactions 

KIFAP3 has been shown to interact with APC, SMC3 and RAP1GDS1.

References

Further reading 

Armadillo-repeat-containing proteins